Kevin Burness (born 17 November 1965 from Newtownards) is a Northern Irish professional darts player who competes in the Professional Darts Corporation (PDC) events.

Career
Burness entered UK Q-School in 2018, winning a two-year Tour Card, by finishing in the top 15 on the Order of Merit, after the four days of Q-School were completed.

Burness won the 2018 Tom Kirby Memorial Irish Matchplay to qualify for the 2019 PDC World Darts Championship, beating Mick McGowan 6–3.

He beat Paul Nicholson 3–0 in the first round of the 2019 PDC World Darts Championship. In the second round against Gary Anderson he was defeated 3–1.

Burness made his PDC European Tour debut in the 2019 Danish Darts Open. He lost 6–1 in the second round against Joe Cullen. He lost his Tour card after the season 2019, when he finished 83rd in PDC Order of Merit.

In January 2022 Burness regained his Tour card via PDC UK Q-School Order of Merit, returning to the circuit for two more years.

World Championship results

PDC
 2019: Second round (lost to Gary Anderson 1–3) (sets)
 2020: First round (lost to Jelle Klaasen 1–3)

Performance timeline
BDO

PDC

PDC European Tour

References

External links

1965 births
Living people
Professional Darts Corporation current tour card holders
People from Newtownards
Darts players from Northern Ireland